Paint Creek is a tributary of the Scioto River,  long, in south-central Ohio in the United States. Via the Scioto and Ohio Rivers, it is part of the watershed of the Mississippi River.

Paint Creek rises in southwestern Madison County and flows initially south-southeastwardly through Fayette County and along the boundaries of Highland and Ross Counties, past the towns of Washington Court House and Greenfield.  Downstream of Greenfield, a dam causes the stream to form Paint Creek Lake, part of Paint Creek State Park.  Below the dam, Paint Creek flows eastwardly through Ross County, past Bainbridge and just to the south of Chillicothe to its confluence with the Scioto River.

Tributaries
Principal tributaries include of Paint Creek include:
Rattlesnake Creek flows to Paint Creek Lake.

Variant names
According to the Geographic Names Information System, Paint Creek has also been known historically as:
Alamoneetheepeece
Chillicotha Creek
Necunsia Skeintat (Found on Lewis Evans’ A General Map of the Middle British Colonies in America, published in 1755.)
Olomon Sepung
Olomoni Siipunk
Pain Creek
Paint River
Pait Creek

See also
List of rivers of Ohio

References

Rivers of Ohio
Rivers of Fayette County, Ohio
Rivers of Highland County, Ohio
Rivers of Madison County, Ohio
Rivers of Ross County, Ohio